Coronal–velar consonants are doubly articulated at the velum and upper teeth and/or the alveolar ridge.

References

Bibliography

 

Place of articulation
Dental consonants
Alveolar consonants
Doubly articulated consonant